James Ruffin may refer to:
 James Edward Ruffin (1893–1977), US Representative from Missouri
 James Ruffin (American football) (born 1987), American football defensive end